Xenophora,  commonly called carrier shells, is a genus of medium-sized to large sea snails, marine gastropod mollusks in the family Xenophoridae, the carrier snails or carrier shells. The genus Xenophora is the type genus of the family Xenophoridae.

Etymology
The name Xenophora comes from two ancient Greek words, and means "bearing foreigners", so-called because in most species the snail cements pieces of rock or shells to its own shell at regular intervals as the shell grows.

Description
The shells of species within this genus vary from small to large (diameter of base without attachments 19-90 mm; height of shell 21-60 mm), depressed-conical, with narrow to very narrow, simple peripheral edge, non-porcellanous ventrally. Foreign objects are attached to all whorls, with generally more than 30% of dorsal surface obscured by these objects. The foreign objects are usually medium-sized to large. Although the foreign objects are usually mollusk shells, pebbles, or small pieces of coral rock, in some instances a bottle cap has been attached by the snail to its shell.

Species
The genus Xenophora includes the following species and subspecies:
 Xenophora minuta Qi & Ma, 1986
 Xenophora robusta Verrill, 1870
 Subgenus Xenophora (Austrophora) Kreipl, Alf & Kronenberg, 1999
 Xenophora flindersi (Cotton & Godfrey, 1938) 
Subgenus Xenophora (Xenophora) Fischer von Waldheim, 1807
 Xenophora cerea (Reeve, 1845) 
 Xenophora chinensis Philippi, 1841)  
 Xenophora conchyliophora (Born, 1780) - American carriersnail (type species of Xenophora)   
 Xenophora corrugata (Reeve, 1842) 
 Xenophora crispa (König, 1825) 
 Xenophora granulosa Ponder, 1983 
 Xenophora japonica Kuroda & Habe in Kuroda et al., 1971 
Xenophora mekranensis (Newton, 1905) 
Xenophora mekranensis konoi Habe, 1953 
 Xenophora neozelanica Suter, 1908  - New Zealand carriershell
 Xenophora neozelandica neozelandica Suter, 1908 
 Xenophora neozelandica kermadecensis Ponder, 1983 
 Xenophora pallidula  (Reeve, 1842)  - pallid carrier shell
 Xenophora peroniana  (Iredale, 1929) 
 Xenophora peroniana peroniana  (Iredale, 1929) 
 Xenophora peroniana kondoi  Ponder 1983 
 Xenophora senegalensis Fischer, 1873
 Xenophora sinensis Qi & Li, 1986
 Xenophora solarioides (Reeve, 1845)
 Xenophora tenuis Fulton, 1938

Species brought into synonymy
 Subgenus Xenophora (Stellaria) Möller, 1832: synonym of Stellaria Möller, 1832
 Xenophora (Stellaria) testigera (Bronn, 1831): synonym of Stellaria testigera (Bronn, 1831)
 Xenophora australis Souverbie & Montrouzier, 1870: synonym of Xenophora (Xenophora) solarioides (Reeve, 1845)
 Xenophora calculifera (Reeve, 1843): synonym of Stellaria chinensis (Philippi, 1841)
 Xenophora caperata sensu Petit de la Saussaye, 1857: synonym of Xenophora (Xenophora) senegalensis Fischer, 1873
 Xenophora caribaea Petit de la Saussaye, 1857 - Caribbean carriersnail: synonym of Onustus caribaeus (Petit de la Saussaye, 1857)
 Xenophora cavelieri Rochebrune, 1883: synonym of Xenophora (Xenophora) senegalensis Fischer, 1873
 Xenophora digitata Martens, 1878: synonym of Stellaria testigera digitata Martens, 1878
 Xenophora gigantea (Schepman, 1909): synonym of Stellaria gigantea (Schepman, 1909)
 Xenophora helvacea Philippi, 1851: synonym of Onustus indicus (Gmelin, 1791)
 Xenophora indica (Gmelin, 1791): synonym of Onustus indicus (Gmelin, 1791)
 Xenophora japonica Kuroda & Habe, 1971: synonym of Xenophora (Xenophora) japonica Kuroda & Habe, 1971
 Xenophora konoi Habe, 1953: synonym of Xenophora (Xenophora) mekranensis konoi Habe, 1953
 Xenophora laevigata Fischer von Waldheim, 1807: synonym of Xenophora (Xenophora) conchyliophora (Born, 1780)
 Xenophora lamberti Souverbie, 1871: synonym of Stellaria lamberti (Souverbie, 1871)
 Xenophora longleyi Bartsch, 1931 - shingled carriersnail: synonym of Onustus longleyi Bartsch, 1931
 Xenophora meandrina Fischer von Waldheim, 1807: synonym of Xenophora (Xenophora) conchyliophora (Born, 1780)
 Xenophora mediterranea Tiberi, 1863: synonym of Xenophora (Xenophora) crispa (König, 1825)
 Xenophora neozelanica Suter, 1908: synonym of Xenophora (Xenophora) neozelanica neozelanica Suter, 1908
 Xenophora regularis  Habe & Okutani, 1983 : synonym of Xenophora (Xenophora) granulosa Ponder, 1983
 Xenophora tenuis Hirase, 1934: synonym of Xenophora (Xenophora) tenuis Fulton, 1983
 Xenophora torrida  Kuroda & Ito, 1961 : synonym of Xenophora (Xenophora) cerea (Reeve, 1845)
 Xenophora tricostata Fischer von Waldheim, 1807: synonym of Xenophora (Xenophora) conchyliophora (Born, 1780)
 Xenophora tulearensis Stewart & Kosuge, 1993: synonym of Xenophora (Xenophora) corrugata (Reeve, 1842)
 Xenophora vulcanica Fischer von Waldheim, 1807: synonym of Xenophora (Xenophora) conchyliophora (Born, 1780)
 Xenophora wagneri Philippi, 1855: synonym of Onustus indicus (Gmelin, 1791)

Extinct species

Extinct species within this genus include: 
 †Xenophora carditigera Nielsen and DeVries 2002
 †Xenophora cummulans Brongniart 1823
 †Xenophora delecta Guppy 1876
 †Xenophora deshayesi Michelotti 1847
 †Xenophora eocenica Abbass 1967
 †Xenophora floridana Mansfield 1930
 †Xenophora infundibulum (Brocchi, 1814)
 †Xenophora palaeoafra Gliozzi and Malatesta 1983
 †Xenophora paulinae Nielsen and DeVries 2002
 †Xenophora rugata Abbass 1967
 †Xenophora tatei Harris 1897
 †Xenophora terpstrai Dey 1961
 †Xenophora textilina Dall 1892

Fossil record
Fossils of Xenophora are found in marine strata from the Cretaceous to Quaternary (age range: from 89.3 to 0.012 million years ago.).  Fossils are known all over the world.

See also
 Images of a live Xenophora conchyliophora, photographed in situ underwater by Anne DuPont

References

 Ponder W.F. (1983). A revision of the Recent Xenophoridae of the World and of the Australian Fossil Species (Mollusca : Gastropoda). Memoir 17. The Australian Museum Sydney, Australia
 Kreipl K. & Alf A. (1999). Recent Xenophoridae. Conchbooks, Hackenheim > Germany. 148pp.

Xenophoridae
Extant Coniacian first appearances